The Standing High Council of the Community of Christ is composed of 12 persons holding the office of High Priest. The right to call members to the Council resides in the First Presidency and the call is sustained by a vote of the Community of Christ World Conference. The only mention of the council in the current church bylaws refers to their authority to approve church judicial procedures presented by the First Presidency. In practice, however, they also issue policy statements at the request of the First Presidency, such as the 1982 Standing High Council Statement on Homosexuality and the 1997 Standing High Council Statement on Privileged and Confidential Communications.

According to the Church Administrator's Handbook

As of 2012, the members of the Standing High Council are: William M. Barnhard, Kent G. Bradford, Valerie K. Brennan, David M. Byrn, Dennis R. Clinefelter, Matthew J. Frizzell, Gwendolyn Hawks-Blue, Sharon M. Kirkpatrick, Marilee A. Martens, Scott A. Roberson, Kathy D. Robinson, Patricia K. Trachsel.

References

Community of Christ